Fernelly Alfonso Castillo Barona (born 5 August 1988) is a former footballer who is last known to have played as a defender or midfielder for Unión Tarapoto. Born in Colombia, he was a Equatorial Guinea international.

Career

Before the 2016 season, Castillo signed for Peruvian second tier side Unión Tarapoto, where he made one league appearance and scored 0 goals. On 15 May 2016, he debuted for Unión Tarapoto during a 1-3 loss to Los Caimanes.

References

External links
 

Equatoguinean footballers
Equatoguinean expatriate footballers
Colombian footballers
Association football midfielders
Association football defenders
Peruvian Segunda División players
Colombian expatriate sportspeople in Peru
Colombian expatriate footballers
Expatriate footballers in Peru
Living people
Footballers from Cali
Equatorial Guinea international footballers
1988 births